Sir William Boxall  (29 June 1800 – 6 December 1879) was an English painter and museum director.

Early life and education
He was born at Oxford on 29 June 1800, and baptised 29 July at St Michael's Church, Oxford, to Thomas Boxall (d. 1847) and his wife Diana (nee Perrett, d.1841). He had an older sister Anne (1794–1846) and a younger sister Emma (1807–1850). He was educated at John Roysse's Free School in Abingdon-on-Thames (now Abingdon School), before entering the Royal Academy Schools in 1819.

Career
Between 1827 and 1845 he made a number of trips to Italy to study the old masters. Initially hoping to make his name as a history painter, Boxall later had to turn to the more lucrative genre of portraiture. Among his friends were William Wordsworth, whose portrait he painted, the sculptor John Gibson and the painter Sir Edwin Landseer. He was the executor of the will of Sir Charles Lock Eastlake, his predecessor as Director of the National Gallery.

Following his appointment in February 1866, as the director of the National Gallery, Boxall practically gave up painting. His directorship lasted eight years, during which he oversaw the construction of Edward Middleton Barry's celebrated eastern extension. In 1869, Boxall negotiated the purchase of Sir Robert Peel's collection of Flemish and Dutch paintings for £7,500. With this purchase the Dutch Golden Age became one of the strengths in the Gallery's holdings. Both of the Gallery's paintings by Michelangelo were bought by Boxall, The Entombment in 1868 and the Manchester Madonna in 1870. The authenticity of the former was called into question by the House of Lords in 1869, but is now generally regarded to be genuine – unlike another of Boxall's controversial acquisitions, the "Suermondt Rembrandt" 7, now attributed to Nicolaes Maes.

He was elected an Associate of the Royal Academy (ARA) in 1851 and a full Royal Academician (RA) in 1863. He was knighted in 1867.

See also
 List of Old Abingdonians

References

Sources
 Avery-Quash, Susanna, "Boxall, William (1800–1879)." Oxford Dictionary of National Biography. Ed. H. C. G. Matthew and Brian Harrison. Oxford: OUP, 2004.

External links
 
 An engraving by Edward Finden of the painting,  with illustrative verse by Letitia Elizabeth Landon in The Literary Souvenir annual for 1831.
 An engraving of the painting, with illustrative verse by Letitia Elizabeth Landon in The Amulet annual for 1832.
 An engraving by James Thomson of the painting, with a poetical illustration by Letitia Elizabeth Landon in Heath's Book of Beauty, 1833.
 , engraved by Richard Austin Artlett for Finden’s Gallery of the Graces, 1834, together with a poetical illustration by Letitia Elizabeth Landon (A Pleasant Memory).

1800 births
1879 deaths
19th-century English painters
Alumni of the Royal Academy Schools
Artists from Oxford
Directors of the National Gallery, London
English curators
English male painters
People educated at Abingdon School
Royal Academicians
19th-century British businesspeople
19th-century English male artists